Yvon Bertin (born 9 April 1953 in Nantes, France) is a former French professional road bicycle racer. He was professional from 1975 to 1982 where he won 11 victories. He wore the yellow jersey for one day in the 1980 Tour de France. Victories included Grand Prix d'Isbergues in 1976, Grand Prix des Rennes 1979 and two stages and overall victory in the Route du Sud of 1979.

Palmarès

1976
Grand Prix d'Isbergues
1979
Grand Prix de Rennes
Route du Sud
1980
Sainte-Marie sur Mer
Tour de France:
Wearing yellow jersey for one day

External links

1953 births
Living people
French male cyclists
Cyclists from Nantes
French Giro d'Italia stage winners